The 1995 NCAA Division I women's basketball tournament featured 64 teams. The Final Four consisted of Connecticut, Tennessee, Stanford, and Georgia. Connecticut defeated Tennessee 70-64 to win its first NCAA title and complete a 35-0 undefeated season.

The first two rounds were held at the home court of the top four seeds in each region (except for San Diego State, which hosted three games in the West region). The regional semifinals and finals were held at the University of Connecticut for the East region, UCLA for the West region, the University of Tennessee for the Mideast region, and Drake University for the Midwest region. The Final Four was played in Minneapolis, Minnesota.

Notable events
In a second-round game, 4 seed Alabama faced the 5 seed Duke. The game was close throughout the contest, with neither team leading the other by more than seven points. With time winding down in regulation, Alabama's Niesa Johnson hit a three-pointer to send the game to overtime. Not just one overtime, the game would eventually feature four overtimes. Johnson went on to hit two free throws at the end of the fourth overtime to give Alabama a 121–120 victory, setting records for the most overtimes, and the most points scored in an NCAA tournament game. At the time, it was called "the best women's basketball game in history".

In the east regional semi-final involving Louisiana tech and Virginia, confusion reigned momentarily with both teams celebrating at the end of regulation. Louisiana Tech led early, with as much as a 13-point lead in the first half and a ten-point lead at halftime. The Cavaliers came back and had a 63–62 lead with seconds left in the game. With time running out, Louisiana Tech's Debra Williams went to the foul line for a one-and-one shot. She missed it, but the scorekeeper accidentally recorded it, so the scoreboard showed 63–63. Louisiana Tech tried and missed a last second shot, but thought they were headed to overtime based upon the score, while Virginia thought they had won, so both teams were celebrating. The referees met at the scores table to sort it out, then Dee Kantner emerged and pointed to the Virginia bench signaling victory.

Georgia and Tennessee, both from the SEC, squared off in one of the Final Four match ups. Tennessee was a number 1 seed, while Georgia was a 3 seed, and upset top seed Colorado 82–79 in the Midwest Rational final. The two teams had faced each other in the final game of the regular season, when the Lady Vols beat the Lady Bulldogs by 22 points. Georgia coach Andy Landers complained about lack of effort in that game, but did not have the same complaints in the Final Four game, even though the final margin was identical. Tennessee's Pat Summitt emphasizes rebounds, and Tennessee out rebounded Georgia 51–33. While the Lady Bulldogs were able to get within seven points in the second half, they could get no closer and Tennessee prevailed 73–51, to send them into the champions ship game.

Despite entering the game against Stanford with an undefeated record, some skeptics weren't convinced that Connecticut could win. Although UConn had beaten Tennessee earlier in the year, they then played in the Big East, which at the time wasn't a strong conference. The Big East earned just two invitations to the NCAA tournament, while eight other conferences had three or more teams in the tournament. Stanford was a representative of the Pacific-10 conference, which had five teams strong enough to earn bids. However, the Huskies jumped out to an early 16–4 lead, and ended the game with a 27-point margin, winning 87–60. Kara Wolters scored 31 points, a single point under her career high while Jamelle Elliott matched her career high with 21 points. Consensus national player of the year Rebecca Lobo added 17 points, prompting coach Auriemma to quip "The reason we're playing [in the final] is I've got these three players [and Tara VanDerveer doesn't.]"

In the championship game, Tennessee had a small lead in the first half 28–25, but more importantly, two of UConn's All-Americans, Jennifer Rizzotti and Rebecca Lobo, had three fouls, while six foot seven inch Kara Wolters had two. Auriemma tried playing small, with six foot Jamelle Elliott the tallest Husky on the floor. The Tennessee lead extended, but only to six points at the half. In the second half, the lead was still four points in the Lady Vols favor when Wolters received her fourth foul. With twelve minutes left to go in the game, Lobo had but six points. Lobo then scored on four possessions, and with a steal by Rizzotti turned into a layup, the Tennessee nine point lead was down to a single point, prompting coach Summitt to call for a time-out. Jamelle Elliott tied the game with just over two minutes left, then Rizzotti made a play which would be talked about for years afterward. She grabbed a rebound, then drove the length of the court against Michelle M. Marciniak. Just before reaching the basket, she executed a cross-over dribble and sank a left-handed layup to take a lead that would never be relinquished. UConn  won the game 70–64, completing the first undefeated season in NCAA history since the 1986 Texas team, and winning the first national championship for the Connecticut Huskies team.

Tournament records
 Free Throws – Connecticut made 34 free throws in the semi-final game against Stanford, setting the record for most free throws completed in a Final Four.
 Most points – Alabama scored 121 points in a four overtime game against Duke, setting the record for most points scored in an NCAA tournament game. The 120 pins scored by Duke is the second most scored in an NCAA tournament game, and the most in a losing effort.
 Field goals attempted – Alabama attempted 114 fields goals in the game against Duke, setting the record for most field goals attempted in an NCAA tournament game.
 Most overtimes – Alabama and Duke played in a four overtime game, the most overtimes in an NCAA tournament game.

Qualifying teams – automatic
Sixty-four teams were selected to participate in the 1995 NCAA Tournament. Thirty-two conferences were eligible for an automatic bid to the 1995 NCAA Tournament .

Qualifying teams – at-large
Thirty-two additional teams were selected to complete the six-four invitations.

Bids by conference
Thirty-two conferences earned an automatic bid.  In seventeen cases, the automatic bid was the only representative from the conference. Thirty-two additional at-large teams were selected from fifteen of the conferences.

First and second rounds

In 1995, the field remained at 64 teams. The teams were seeded, and assigned to four geographic regions, with seeds 1-16 in each region. In Round 1, seeds 1 and 16 faced each other, as well as seeds 2 and 15, seeds 3 and 14, seeds 4 and 13, seeds 5 and 12, seeds 6 and 11, seeds 7 and 10, and seeds 8 and 9. In the first two rounds, the top four seeds were given the opportunity to host the first-round game. In most cases, the higher seed accepted the opportunity. The exception:

 Fourth seeded Purdue was eligible to host, but unable to, so fifth seeded San Diego State hosted three first and second-round games

The following table lists the region, host school, venue and the sixteen first and second round locations:

Regionals and Final Four

The Regionals, named for the general location, were held from March 23 to March 25 at these sites:

 East Regional  Harry A. Gampel Pavilion, Storrs, Connecticut (Host: University of Connecticut)
 Mideast Regional   Thompson-Boling Arena, Knoxville, Tennessee (Host: University of Tennessee)
 West Regional  Pauley Pavilion, Los Angeles, California (Host: University of California, Los Angeles)
 Midwest Regional  Knapp Center, Des Moines, Iowa (Host: Drake University)

Each regional winner advanced to the Final Four held April 1 and April 2 in Minneapolis, Minnesota at the  Target Center,

Bids by state

The sixty-four teams came from thirty-three states, plus Washington, D.C. California had the most teams with five bids. Seventeen states did not have any teams receiving bids.

Bracket

East region - Storrs, Connecticut

West region - Los Angeles, California

Mideast region - Knoxville, Tennessee

Midwest region - Des Moines, Iowa

Final Four – Minneapolis, Minnesota

* denotes number of overtime periods

Record by conference
Seventeen conferences had more than one bid, or at least one win in NCAA Tournament play:

Fifteen conferences went 0-1: Big South Conference, Big West Conference, Colonial, Ivy League, MAAC, Mid-Continent, MEAC, Midwestern Collegiate, North Atlantic Conference, Northeast Conference, Ohio Valley Conference,  Patriot League, Southern Conference, Southland, and SWAC

All-Tournament team

 Rebecca Lobo, Connecticut
 Jamelle Elliott, Connecticut
 Jennifer Rizzotti, Connecticut
 Kara Wolters, Connecticut
 Nikki McCray, Tennessee

Game officials

 Sally Bell (semifinal)
 Art Bomengen (semifinal)
 Violet Palmer (semifinal)
 Sidney Bunch (semifinal)
 Dee Kantner (final)
 Larry Sheppard (final)

See also
 1995 NCAA Division I men's basketball tournament
 1995 NCAA Division II women's basketball tournament
 1995 NCAA Division III women's basketball tournament
 1995 NAIA Division I women's basketball tournament
 1995 NAIA Division II women's basketball tournament

References

 
NCAA Division I women's basketball tournament
NCAA Division I women's basketball tournament
NCAA Division I women's basketball tournament
Basketball in Lubbock, Texas
Events in Lubbock, Texas
Sports competitions in Texas